Scovil may refer to:

Carlos P. Scovil (1804–1904), American lawyer and politician
Doug Scovil (1927–1989), American football player and coach
George G. Scovil (1842–1908), merchant and political figure in New Brunswick, Canada
George Scovil (priest), Canadian Anglican priest in the 20th Century
Henry Evelyn Derek Scovil (1923–2010), physicist, worked on masers and bubble memory
John W. Scovil (1869–1953), Canadian politician
Thelma Scovil (1911–1979), English-born badminton player
Walter Scovil (1823–1903), farmer and political figure in New Brunswick
Scovil Neales (1864–1936), Dean of Fredericton, Canada

See also
4939 Scovil, minor planet